Thomas Johnson, Tom Johnson or Tommy Johnson may refer to:

Arts and entertainment
Tom Johnson (composer) (born 1939), American minimalist composer
Tommy Johnson (tubist) (1935–2006), American orchestral tuba player
Tommy Johnson (musician) (1896–1956), American blues guitarist
Thomas Johnson (music producer) (born 1957), American audio engineer, producer, and musician
Tom Johnson (sound engineer) (born 1958), American film sound mixer
Thomas Johnson (animator) (1907–1960), American film animator; most prominently worked for Fleischer Studios
Thomas Johnson, known as Tommy the Clown (active since 1992), American dancer
Tom Loftin Johnson (artist) (1900–1963), American painter and art teacher at West Point
Tommy Johnson (actor) (1931–2005), Swedish actor

Business
Thomas Johnson (born in 1810s), namesake of John & Thomas Johnson, a soap and alkali manufacturing business
Thomas Fielding Johnson (1828–1921), British businessman and philanthropist
Tom Johnson (journalist) (born 1941), American media executive; publisher of the Los Angeles Times and president of CNN
Thomas S. Johnson (21st century), American banker

Design
Thomas Johnson (designer) (1714–1778), English furniture maker, woodcarver and author
T.C. Johnson (Thomas Crosley Johnson, 1862–1934), American firearms designer

Politics

U.K.
Thomas Johnson (died 1569), MP for St Albans and Bossiney
Thomas Johnson (Serjeant-at-Arms) (died 1592), MP for Leicester
Thomas Johnson (died 1660), MP for Great Yarmouth
Thomas Johnson (Liverpool merchant) (1664–1728), English Member of Parliament
Thomas Johnson (Irish politician) (1872–1963), Irish nationalist; leader of Irish Labour Party in Irish Parliament
Tom Johnston (British politician) (1881-1965), Secretary of State for Scotland, MP for West Stirlingshire and Dundee

U.S.
Thomas Johnson (judge) (1732–1819), American jurist; one of the Founding Fathers; Governor of Maryland; Supreme Court justice
Thomas Johnson (Kansas politician) (1802–1865), American Methodist missionary in Kansas territorial legislature; namesake of Johnson County
Thomas Johnson (Kentucky politician) (1812–1906), Confederate congressman during the early part of the American Civil War
Thomas Johnson (Wisconsin politician) (1854–?), Wisconsin State Assemblyman
Tom L. Johnson (1854–1911), U.S. Representative from Ohio, 1891–1895; Mayor of Cleveland, 1901–1909
Thomas Francis Johnson (1909–1988), U.S. Representative from Maryland
Thomas W. Johnson (active 1977–2006), American politician in Ohio
Tom Johnson (Illinois politician) (born 1945), Illinois State Senator

Other political figures
Thomas Johnson (Australian politician) (1819–1894), businessman and MHA in South Australia
Thomas Alexander Johnson (1835–1914), businessman and member of the Queensland Legislative Council
Thomas Herman Johnson (1870–1927), Canadian politician in Manitoba

Scholars and academics
H. Thomas Johnson (born 1938), American accounting historian 
Thomas Johnson (botanist) (c. 1600–1644), English apothecary and botanist
Thomas Johnson (scholar) (died 1737), English cleric and academic
Thomas Johnson (botany teacher) (1863–1954), English authority on plants; professor of Botany at University College Dublin

Thomas Howard Johnson (21st century), director of the Naval Postgraduate School's Program for Culture & Conflict Studies

Sports

American football
Thomas Johnson (American football coach) (1917–2007), Negro league baseball player and American football coach
Thomas Johnson (defensive tackle) (born 1981), American defensive tackle
Tom Johnson (tackle, born 1931), American football offensive/defensive tackle for Michigan and the Green Bay Packers
Tom Johnson (defensive tackle, born 1984), American defensive tackle drafted by the Indianapolis Colts
Pepper Johnson (born 1964), American football linebacker and coach

Association football
Thomas Johnson (South African footballer) (1942–2011), South African football player and manager
Tom Johnson (footballer, born 1911) (1911–1983), English football defender for Sheffield United and Lincoln City
Tom Johnson (footballer, born 1921) (1921–1999), English footballer, Inside Forward for Gateshead and Nottingham Forest
Tom Johnson (footballer, born 1926), English football left half or forward for Darlington and Bradford Park Avenue
Tommy Johnson (footballer, born 1901) (1901–1973), English football forward for Manchester City and Everton
Tommy Johnson (footballer, born 1971), English football striker for Notts County, Derby County, Aston Villa and Celtic

Baseball
Thomas P. Johnson (1914–2000), American Major League Baseball team owner (Pittsburgh Pirates)
Tom Johnson (baseball, born 1951), American pitcher for the Minnesota Twins
Tom Johnson (baseball, born 1889) (1889–1926), American pitcher in the Negro leagues
Tommy Johnson (baseball), American pitcher in the Negro leagues

Boxing
Tom Johnson (bareknuckle boxer) (1750–1797), born Tom Jackling, English bare-knuckle boxer
Tom Johnson (American boxer) (born 1964), American featherweight boxer

Rugby
Thomas Johnson (rugby league), English rugby league footballer of the 1930s and 1940s
Tom Johnson (rugby union, born 1893) (1893–1948), Wales international rugby union player
Tom Johnson (rugby union, born 1982), rugby union player for Exeter Chiefs

Other sports
Thomas Johnson (cyclist) (Horace Thomas Johnson, 1886–1966), British cyclist in the 1908 Summer Olympics
Tom Johnson (golfer) (born 1981), American member of the PGA tour
Tom Johnson (ice hockey) (1928–2007), Canadian ice hockey defenceman
Tom Johnson (lacrosse) (born 1985), Canadian lacrosse player
Tom Johnson (runner), American runner third at the 1995 IAU 100 km World Championships 
Tom Johnson (swimming coach) (born 1963), American swim and diving coach

Others
Thomas Johnson (monk) (died 1537), English Carthusian monk

Thomas Johnson (architect) (c. 1762–1814), British architect
Thomas 15X Johnson (1935–2009), American convicted in the 1965 assassination of Malcolm X
Tom Johnson (astronomer) (1923–2012), American astronomer and electrical engineer, founder of Celestron
Tom Johnson (lawyer) (born 1971), American attorney based in Portland, Oregon
Thomas Johnson (murderer) (1898–1939), convicted of a double murder in Dunolly, Victoria

Thomas Hope Johnson (1899–1998), American physicist and cosmic ray researcher

Fictional characters
Tommy Johnson, blues musician in the 2000 American criminal comedy film O Brother, Where Art Thou?
Tommy "Banana" Johnson - see List of Viz comic strips

See also
Thomas Johnston (disambiguation)
Tim Johnson (disambiguation)